Lip Service is a British television serial drama portraying the lives of a group of lesbian women living in Glasgow, Scotland. Production on the show, which stars Laura Fraser, Ruta Gedmintas and Fiona Button, began in summer 2009 in Glasgow. The show debuted on BBC Three on 12 October 2010. Filming on a second series was confirmed in late 2010, with filming beginning on 30 May 2011. The second series aired on BBC Three from 20 April 2012. In January 2013, the show's creator, Harriet Braun, announced that BBC Three had cancelled the series without explanation.

Cast

Episodes

Series 1

Series 2

Production
Braun was asked by the BBC to create a UK-based lesbian drama; she stated that the first scene that came to mind when she began writing was "a woman crying in an inappropriate place after finding out her ex is seeing someone else" followed by "someone returning from New York and throwing her ex into a state of panic". Those two scenes resulted in the creation of the three lead characters: Cat and Frankie, and Tess.

Braun gave each of the actors an outline of their character, and then let them develop the full characterisation. For Gedmintas, this included cutting her previously long blond hair to a close cut bob. A rumor arose that the director gave each cast member a manual on lesbian sex, which they were expected to read before shooting began, but Braun confirmed in an interview with Australia's Star Observer that this was only a myth. The first series was shot in its entirety in Glasgow in winter 2009/10.

Reception

Ratings
The first episode debuted with 580,000 viewers, picking up an additional 8,000 viewers on the BBC HD channel. It had an audience share of 4.4%.

Critical response
The opening episode received mixed reviews from critics. Claudia Cahalane of The Guardian wrote that it was "hugely significant" for a drama to normalise lesbian and bisexual relationships, citing a study of BBC output which found that lesbians contributed to just two minutes of programming from a randomly selected 39 hours of broadcasts. While Cahalane expressed disappointment that the episode did not represent butch lesbians, she deemed it "important to recognise Lip Service for the great service it's doing to British lesbians." Keith Watson of the Metro attacked the series' tokenism, suggesting that it included lipstick lesbian clichés to meet the BBC's diversity quota, and commenting that, "It was trying so hard to be modern and liberated but it felt tired and lazy". The Independent Amol Rajan criticized the episode's "pathetically vacuous plot", calling the series "spirit-cripplingly tedious". He expressed sympathy for the "clearly talented" cast, opining: "In trying to make a point about the importance of engaging with lesbian issues, this show ends up trivialising them. The lesbians are presented to us not as interesting people, or characters who warrant sympathy; rather, they matter purely because of their sexual preferences. That is immature, patronising, and unrealistic." Evangelical pressure group the Christian Institute reported that the episode had prompted complaints from viewers over its sexual content.

References

External links
 
 

2010 Scottish television series debuts
BBC Scotland television shows
2012 Scottish television series endings
2010s British LGBT-related drama television series
Lesbian-related television shows
Television shows set in Glasgow
BBC television dramas
2010s Scottish television series